Naya Pala is  also the name of the third Kamboja ruler of Bengal (last quarter of tenth century AD).  He was younger son of Rajyapala Kamboj, the founder of the Kamboja Dynasty of Bengal and succeeded to the throne after death of Narayan Pala (of Kamboja line).  Naya Pala of the Kamboja line assumed the imperial title of Parameshvara paramabhattaraka maharajadhirAja Nayapaladeva.

References

Rulers of Bengal
Kambojas